John Scott Youll VC (6 June 1897 – 27 October 1918) was a British recipient of the Victoria Cross, the highest and most prestigious award for gallantry in the face of the enemy that can be awarded to British and Commonwealth forces.

Details
A former colliery electrician at Thornley, Durham, he was 21 years old, and a temporary second lieutenant in the 1st Battalion, The Northumberland Fusiliers, British Army, attached to  11th (Service) Battalion during the First World War when the following deed took place at the battle of Asiago for which he was awarded the VC.

On 15 June 1918 south west of Asiago, Italy, Second Lieutenant Youll was commanding a patrol which came under heavy enemy fire. Sending his men back to safety he remained to watch the situation and then, unable to rejoin his company, he reported to a neighbouring unit where he took command of a party of men from different units, holding his position against enemy attack until a machine-gun opened fire behind him. He rushed and captured the gun, killing most of the team and opened fire, inflicting heavy casualties. He then carried out three separate counterattacks, driving the enemy back each time.

He was killed in action during the battle of Vittorio Veneto, Italy, on 27 October 1918.

Further information
He was also the holder of the Italian Silver Medal of Military Valor. He is buried at Giavera British Cemetery, Treviso province.

In 2005, his home village of Thornley unveiled a memorial in his honour. The four faces of the memorial briefly detail his life, Army career and his Victoria Cross citation.

References

1897 births
1918 deaths
People from County Durham (district)
British Army personnel of World War I
Italian front (World War I)
British World War I recipients of the Victoria Cross
Royal Northumberland Fusiliers officers
British military personnel killed in World War I
Recipients of the Silver Medal of Military Valor
British Army recipients of the Victoria Cross
Military personnel from County Durham
Burials in Italy